Samuel Sachs (July 28, 1851 – March 2, 1935) was an American investment banker.

Early life
Samuel Sachs was born on July 28, 1851, in Maryland, the son of Sophie (née Baer) and Joseph Sachs, both Jewish immigrants from Bavaria, Germany. He had one older sibling, Julius Sachs, and three younger siblings, Emily Sachs, Henry Sachs, and Bernard Sachs.

Career
Sachs, along with his longtime friend Philip Lehman of Lehman Brothers, pioneered the issuing of stock as a way for new companies to raise funds.

Sachs then joined his father-in-law Marcus Goldman's firm which prompted the name change to Goldman Sachs in 1904. Together they underwrote securities offerings for such large firms as Sears, Roebuck and Company. During this time Goldman Sachs also diversified to become involved in other major securities markets, like the over-the-counter, bond, and convertibles markets which are still a big part of the company's revenue today. Sachs retired in 1928.

Philanthropy
Sachs donated US$50,000 (equivalent to $ in ) to Harvard University in 1924.

Personal life and death
Sachs married Louisa Goldman, the youngest daughter of Marcus Goldman, also Bavarian Jewish immigrants. They resided at The Pierre. They had four children: Paul Joseph Sachs, Arthur Sachs, Walter Edward Sachs, and Ella S. Sachs.

Sachs died on March 2, 1935, in New York City.

See also
Goldman–Sachs family

References

1851 births
1935 deaths
American investment bankers
American people of German-Jewish descent
Businesspeople from Maryland
Businesspeople from New York City
Chairmen of Goldman Sachs
Chief Executive Officers of Goldman Sachs
Jewish American bankers